Kulrathna Maha Vidyalaya also known as P. De S. Kularathna Vidyalaya is a mixed school in Ambalangoda, Sri Lanka. The school was established in 1986 by Dayawansha Ginige who was the founder principal of the school. The school is named after the famous Sri Lankan educationist Patrick de Silva Kularatne. Presently Kulrathna Maha Vidyalaya provides primary and secondary education to a student population of over 3000.

Educational institutions established in 1986
Provincial schools in Sri Lanka
Buildings and structures in Ambalangoda
Schools in Galle District
1986 establishments in Sri Lanka